Stanze is the second studio album by Italian contemporary classical music composer Ludovico Einaudi, released in 1992. The tracks, written for electric harp, are all performed by Cecilia Chailly.

Track listing

References

External links
 Ludovico Einaudi's Official website

1997 classical albums
Ludovico Einaudi albums